Dennis Oguta Oliech 
(born 2 February 1985) is a Kenyan retired professional footballer who played as a striker. As a member of the Kenya national team, he became his nation's second all-time goalscorer, behind William "Chege" Ouma (35 goals), with 34 goals before retiring from international football in 2016.

Club career

Early career
Oliech started playing football for Dagoretti Santos in his earlier years, then Mathare United. While in his youth career, Oliech went on trial with Ligue 1 side Marseille, but Mathare United chairman Bob Munro blocked the move from happening.

During Oliech's career with Al-Arabi in Qatar, Oliech was playing under a different middle-east name. At one point he said he even forgot the name and had to be reminded that it was his name.

Oliech turned professional in 2003 playing for Al-Arabi in Qatar until late 2005. In 2004, he was offered a chance to change his citizenship from Kenyan to Qatari. But he refused the offer. At age nineteen, Oliech was named by The Guardian newspaper as one of the world's most promising young players in a list which included future stars such as Wayne Rooney and Robin Van Persie.
While at Qatar, Oliech played alongside Stefan Effenberg and Gabriel Batistuta during their time at Qatar. In 2005, Al-Arabi turned down a Sh100m offer from Monaco to sign Oliech. During the same year, Al-Arabi was told to pay US$15,000 compensation to his youth club by the Fifa's Dispute Resolution Chamber (DRC), as the move to sign Oliech. His goalscoring form is well known for goal poacher.

While at Qatar, Oliech played alongside Stefan Effenberg and Gabriel Batistuta during their time at Qatar. He quoted "Batistuta told me, 'Oliech just run and fall in the box and leave the penalty for me'." In 2005, Al-Arabi turned down a Sh100m offer from Monaco to sign Oliech. During the same year, Al-Arabi was told to pay US$15,000 compensation to his youth club by the Fifa's Dispute Resolution Chamber (DRC), as the move to sign Oliech. His goalscoring form is well known for goal poacher.

Nantes
In 2005, Oliech signed a four-year contract with the French Ligue 1 team Nantes, with the fee of $3.7 million (KSh.281.2 million/=). Upon the move in January, Oliech was given a number nine shirt. However, his youth club Mathare United claims Nantes owed them Sh14m, but the claims were dismissed.

Shortly after signing for Nantes, Oliech hadn't made a great start in France after a knee operation. Then, thirty-days later, he was given all-clear by the doctors and returned to training. He made his debut, on 11 March 2006, when he came on for Julio Hernán Rossi, in the 66th minute, as Nante drew 1–1 with Lille. Three weeks later, on 1 April 2006, Oliech scored his first goal, in the round of 16 in the Coupe de France to send them to the quarter-final, in a 1–0 win over Dijon. and his second goal was followed up in the league match, in a 3–1 loss against Marseille. Later in the 2005–06 season, Oliech made nine appearances and scoring twice.

In the 2006–07 season, Oliech scored four times in thirty-two appearances and the season was proved to be difficult for him, as he soon lost his first team place. Despite lack of first team opportunities and linked with a Premier League club, Oliech says he is happy at the club. However, FC Nantes were relegated in 2007 after finishing bottom of Ligue 1.

Auxerre
In the summer transfer window, Oliech was signed on loan by Auxerre who were in need of goals after a bad start to their season. After two months absent, Oliech finally made his debut, in a 5–3 win over Lorient. After making ten appearances so far in the 2007–08 season, Auxerre signed him on a permanent basis from Nantes in January and keeping him until 2011. Later in the 2007/2008 season, Oliech scored three goals in 24 games, including a brace against Rennes.

He endured what were considered below-average seasons by most in the 2008–09 (scoring three goals in thirty-three appearances in all competitions) and 2009–10 season (scoring four goal in thirty-seven appearances in all competitions), as his form dropped badly, due to his making several match deciding errors and misjudgements. Then, in the 2010–11 season, Oliech received more confidence by Manager Jean Fernandez, who gave him more playing time. On 25 September 2010, Oliech scored twice in a 2–2 draw against Rennes. After featuring twice in the Champions League so far, Oliech was sent-off after receiving a second yellow card, in a 2–1 loss against Ajax in Matchday Three in the Champions League Group-Stage. Though Auxerre did badly in the Champions League Group-Stage, finishing last, with one point, Oliech featured five games. On 5 January 2011, he signed a new two-year contract, which he will remain until at least the summer of 2013. At the end of the 2010–11 season, Oliech scored four times in forty-three appearances.

In 2011–12 season changed when the club appointed Laurent Fournier as their new manager. On 25 September 2011, Oliech scored his first ever hat-trick for Auxerre in a 4–1 win over Sochaux. The hat-trick was accomplished within the span of 16 minutes. Soon after in early-December, Oliech scored two goals in two consecutive matches, against PSG and Nice. Though later in the season, his form dropped badly, due to making several match deciding errors and misjudgements, having his goalscoring form had gone less and it couldn't get worse for the club, as they are relegated to Ligue 2, but Oliech was the club's top scorer.

At the end of the 2011–12 season, Oliech have since attracted interests from clubs around Europe and France and expected to leave the club. Oliech was close of joining Turkish side Kasımpaşa for worth two million and contract detail of three years. But unfortunately, the move couldn't be agreed and he made a return to Auxerre. In the 2012–13 season, Oliech would score three goals in seventeen league appearances in the first half of the season.

Ajaccio
In the January transfer window, Oliech announced he wanted to leave Auxerre, ending a six-year association with the club on 15 January 2013, so he could take on a fresh challenge. On 22 January 2013, Oliech was unveiled by Ajaccio of Ligue 1 after completing a move from Ligue 2 side Auxerre and signing a two and a half-year contract. He was handed the number 29 jersey and went on to score on his debut against Evian Thonon Gaillard in a 1–1 draw, which he was delighted to score on his debut.

Dubai CSC
On 12 February 2015, Oliech terminated his contract with AC Ajaccio, which was to run until June 2015 on mutual consent. The club then announced that Oliech would join UAE Arabian Gulf League side Al-Nasr. However, on 21 April 2015, it was confirmed that Oliech had joined Dubai CSC in the UAE Division 1 league and not Al-Nasr.

Gor Mahia

On 2 January 2019, 33-year-old Dennis Oliech agreed a two-year contract with Kenyan giants Gor Mahia, becoming the highest paid footballer in the country at a fee of Kshs.350,000.

Club Career Stats

International career

His first international match was in 2002, when Kenya lost to Nigeria 3–0.

He scored five goals at the 2002 CECAFA Cup, leading Kenya to the title as well as getting the top scorer award.

Oliech scored three goals, including the winning goal against Cape Verde Islands in the final match of 2004 African Cup of Nations qualification as Kenya qualified for the final tournament. He also scored a goal in a 3–0 win over Burkina Faso in the 2004 African Cup of Nations itself.

In 2005, Oliech made controversy when he refused to join the national team squad after officials from the Kenya Football Federation (KFF) told him was owed them US$1,700. His mother defended him, believing he has a right to demand for his money from the Kenya Football Federation. Days before that, Oliech injured his knee ahead of a 2006 World Cup qualifier, but later revealed he quickly recovered from the minor injury. Eight days later, Oliech apologised for his behaviour over the entire situation.

On 24 March 2016, Oliech announced his retirement from international football.

Most Kenyans believe Oliech's biggest match was against Cape Verd when he scored a last minute goal to allow Harambee Stars qualify for AFCON Championship in 2004. When asked about his biggest match for the national team, he said "for us football strikers, all matches are big because we have to score. If we don't score then that match wasn't big."

International goals
Scores and results list Kenya's goal tally first.

Honours

National team
CECAFA Cup: 2002

Individual
CECAFA Cup Golden Boot: 2002

Personal life
Oliech's older brother, Nixon Onywanda, is the coach of the Kenyan side Dagoretti Santos (for which Oliech once played). Oliech has a son with his girlfriend and drives a porche car and lives in an expansive house. In June 2011, Oliech purchased himself a new car, the Chrysler 300C SRT-8 series.

In late 2005, a warrant of arrest was issued against Oliech after he failed to appear in court to answer to assault charges raised against him.

In late-May 2006, Oliech was admitted to hospital after a disagreement, which led to a brawl and left him with face injuries. This just came after being in hospital following his injury in the exhibition match in Maringo during a local tournament.

Oliech retired from National football in 2016.

References

External links

 
 Dennis Oliech National Stats FoStats.com
 Dennis Oliech Soka.co.ke
 

1985 births
Living people
Kenyan Luo people
Footballers from Nairobi
Kenyan footballers
Kenya international footballers
Kenyan expatriate footballers
Association football forwards
Mathare United F.C. players
Al-Arabi SC (Qatar) players
FC Nantes players
AJ Auxerre players
AC Ajaccio players
Dubai CSC players
Qatar Stars League players
Ligue 1 players
Ligue 2 players
Expatriate footballers in France
Expatriate footballers in Qatar
Expatriate footballers in the United Arab Emirates
Kenyan expatriate sportspeople in Qatar
Kenyan expatriate sportspeople in France
Kenyan expatriate sportspeople in the United Arab Emirates
2004 African Cup of Nations players
UAE First Division League players